Vera Cruz Records was a record label, based in Edmonton, Canada and distributed by CBS Records, that existed from 1978 to 1982.  The label, owned by Wes Dakus, is notable for having released records by Don Everly, Hoyt Axton, One Horse Blue, Fosterchild and The Models, among others.

Album Discography

1978 Bryan Fustukian Fustukian  
1978 One Horse Blue One Horse Blue   
1979 Mavis McCauley Mavis McCauley   
1979 The Models The Models
1979 Hoyt Axton A Rusty Old Halo 
1980 One Horse Blue Bite the Bullet 
1980 Fosterchild On the Prowl 
1980 Hoyt Axton Where Did the Money Go?     
1980 Don Everly Brother Jukebox
1980 Mavis McCauley Racer 
1981 Ronnie Prophet The Phantom 
1981 One Horse Blue Livin' on the Edge 
1981 P.J. Burton P.J. Burton    
1981 Tony Prophet Tony Prophet 
1981 Hoyt Axton Live!     
1981 Richard Stepp Richard Stepp 
1982 Sunband Sunband     
1982 One Horse Blue On the Street     
1982 Sidro's Armada One Hand Joe   
1982 Hoyt Axton Pistol Packin' Mama 
1982 Jo Ann Paul Jo Ann Paul 
1982 Darkroom Pressure

References

Canadian independent record labels